That Sugar Film is a 2014 Australian documentary directed by and starring Damon Gameau. The film looks at hidden sugar in foods and the effect it can have on the human body.

Plot

The film follows Gameau's experiment on himself, changing from his normal diet containing no refined sugar to a 'health-conscious' diet low in fat but high in sugar, equivalent to 160 grams (40 tsp) of sugar per day. As a result, Gameau gained weight, grew lethargic, and developed fatty liver disease. The sugar diet was selected such that his calorie intake was not increased from his normal diet.

Interviews with experts attribute this change to the high level of sugar he was ingesting, and in particular suggest that fructose may be the main culprit. It is suggested that artificial sweeteners may be no better.

The viewers are introduced to the "bliss point", a term coined in the 1960s which applies here to the amount of sugar you can add to a food to make it optimally desirable.  Adding more sugar beyond the "bliss point" leads to a significant drop in desirability.

Following the experiment, he returned to his previous diet, and the ill effects were largely and quickly reversed

Cast

In addition to Gameau in the lead, the cast includes Hugh Jackman, Stephen Fry, Isabel Lucas, and Brenton Thwaites. Gary Taubes, Michael Moss and Dr. Kimber Stanhope gave interviews which are included, and Depeche Mode, Peter Gabriel and Florence and the Machine feature on the soundtrack.  Gameau's partner, actress Zoe Tuckwell-Smith, appears in the film while pregnant with their daughter, who makes an appearance after being born during production.

Reception 
American reviews for the film were generally positive. According to a review by The New York Times, the "breezy blend of computer imagery, musical numbers, sketches and offbeat field trips" made "the nutrition lessons easy to digest". The Hollywood Reporter concluded that "Gameau clearly has good intentions, and generally succeeds in sweetening a potentially bitter subject for easy public consumption." However, a Slate review insisted "That Sugar Film is so highly processed, and so laden with chintzy, artificial arguments, that its many weaknesses are hidden from consumers."

A local Australian review in The Sydney Morning Herald claimed that the film is "not rigorous enough to prove anything at all". However, the content of the article seems rather oriented towards ad-hominem attacks which have little to do with the substance of the subject.

An article from SBS Australia discussing the film's legacy describes it as "One of Australia’s most successful docos".

The film is recommended as an educational resource by Documentary Australia Foundation, which notes "THAT SUGAR FILM will forever change the way you think about ‘healthy’ food".

References

External links
Official website

Documentary films about sugar
Australian documentary films
2014 films
Madman Entertainment
2010s English-language films